Industrial Democracy (1st edn 1897; 9th edn 1926) is a book written by British socialist reformers Sidney Webb and Beatrice Webb, concerning the organisation of trade unions and collective bargaining. The book introduced the term industrial democracy to the social sciences, which has since gained a different meaning in modern industrial relations.

Industrial Democracy was published in 1897, three years after the Webbs published History of Trade Unionism, an account of the roots and development of the British trade union movement.

Outline
Industrial Democracy is divided into three parts. The first part concerns the structure of trade unions and concludes that "Trade Unions are democracies; that is to say their internal constitutions are all based on the principle 'government of the people by the people for the people.'" Part II focuses on the function of trade unions and specifically the method of collective bargaining. The third part delves into the theory of trade unions.

The imbalance of behaviour between employers and employees was described by the Webbs as follows.

Significance
Industrial Democracy had a profound impact on the British labour movement, and socialism worldwide. It was translated into multiple languages, including a translation into Russian by Vladimir Lenin.

See also
Trade unionism
UK labour law

Notes

References
WH Dawson, 'Review' (Jul., 1898) 12 Annals of the American Academy of Political and Social Science 136–143

External links

Industrial Democracy (1902 edition) on archive.org
Industrial Democracy (1920 edition) on archive.org

1897 books
1902 non-fiction books
Books about labor history